Oru Veedu Iru Vaasal is a 1990 Indian Tamil-language drama film directed by K. Balachander starring Yamini, Kumaresh and Ganesh. The film had two storylines, first story was adapted from the novel Meendum Meendum by Anuradha Ramanan and the second story was written by Ananthu. Violin virtuoso-brothers Ganesh and Kumaresh made their acting débuts. The film had no songs. The film won the National Film Award for Best Film on Other Social Issues at the 38th National Film Awards.

Plot 

The film contains two distinct story lines, each story lines revolves around Ganesh and Kumaresh. This film depicts difficulties women face(d) in a predominantly male dominated society. How these women when pushed to edge fight their ostracised husbands and set a tone and lead a meaningful life.

Cast 
 Yamini as Vinodha
 Kumaresh as Sukumar     .
 Ganesh as Jawahar
 Livingston as Arun Kapoor
 Surya as Shenbagam
 Vaishnavi as Yamuna
 Charle as Elango
 Vivek as Panneer
 K. S. Jayalakshmi as Sivappu Rukmani
 Kavithalya Krishnan as Assistant director
 Sithara (Guest appearance)
 Nizhalgal Ravi (Guest appearance)
 Disco Shanti (Guest appearance)
 R. Sundaramoorthy (Guest appearance)
 Brinda (Uncredited Cameo appearance)

Production
One of the shooting locations was a bungalow called Kamakoti House in T. Nagar.

Release and reception 
Oru Veedu Iru Vaasal was released on 7 September 1990. The Indian Express said, "When you read a novel, if the author has any creative power and capacity to create engrossing characters, and if you have the sensibility to appreciate this, you enter into a whole new world. Seeing Kavithalaya's Oru Veedu Iru Vaasal directed by K. Balachander opened up such vistas for this writer." Ki. Rajendran of Kalki praised the film for eschewing box-office ingredients like action, comedy and songs. The film became a box-office bomb.

Accolades

References

External links 
 

1990 films
1990s Tamil-language films
Best Film on Other Social Issues National Film Award winners
Films based on Indian novels
Films directed by K. Balachander
Films with screenplays by K. Balachander
Films scored by V. S. Narasimhan